Warning was a UK-based doom metal band.

Warning flagged the rise of post-2000 wave of traditional doom metal, and were one of the most important, highly regarded and influential bands to emerge from the '90s doom metal scene.
The band was founded by guitarist/singer/songwriter Patrick Walker in 1994 in Harlow, Essex. Warning's music is notable for its down-tempo, progressive, melodic and heavy doom-laden sound; the idiosyncratic and poignant vocals of Patrick Walker; and his introspective, darkly-confessional lyrical themes.

The band released two demo tapes, Revelation Looms in February 1996 and Blessed by the Sabbath in March 1997, which led them to gain underground metal press attention and label interest.

Warning debuted in 1999 with The Strength to Dream on the Miskatonic Foundation label. With this album, Warning gained a cult status within doom metal circles, but they soon disbanded after their 2001 European tour with Jack Frost. They regrouped for an acclaimed performance at the Doom Shall Rise festival in Germany, 2005.

In April 2006, following a Scandinavian tour with Reverend Bizarre at the start of the year, the band flew to Rosenquarz Studio in Lübeck, Germany, where they recorded their second album, Watching from a Distance. Released the following winter to enormous acclaim, it has been heralded as one of the most influential doom metal albums of the past 30 years and one of the landmark metal albums of the decade.

Both albums were initially released on vinyl by Metal Supremacy, each on gatefold double vinyl, as limited pressings, and later by Cyclone Empire, again as one-off pressings.
After an unauthorised and low-quality vinyl release by Kreation Records surfaced in 2012, Patrick acquired the rights to the band's recordings, and since then the many subsequent vinyl repressings have been licensed to Svart Records, with whom Patrick continues to have a strong working relationship.

Patrick Walker decided to discontinue the band in January 2009 and continues to write and record music as 40 Watt Sun.

Warning reunited for a performance at the 2017 edition of Roadburn Festival in the Netherlands, where they played Watching from a Distance in its entirety, after which they toured the album on both sides of the Atlantic in a series of celebrated live concerts.

In 2019, Kerrang! named 'Watching from a Distance' number 1 of their "13 Bleakest Rock And Metal Albums Ever", writing, "the depths of anguish conjured by Essex-based frontman Patrick Walker (now of 40 Watt Sun)... are still utterly, utterly unmatched."
Metal Hammer magazine listed the album's title track as number 1 on its list of "The 10 most heartbreaking doom metal songs", and featured Warning in their "Top 50 Greatest Cult Bands" feature.
Decibel Magazine included Watching from a Distance among its Top 20 Doom Metal Albums of All Time.
Terrorizer Magazine featured the album in its Top Albums of the Decade (2000–2009).

In his 2017 book A History of Heavy Metal, author Andrew O'Neill described Warning as "the best doom band of the bunch", writing, "their 2006 release 'Watching from a Distance' contains possibly the most emotionally affecting song in all of heavy metal – the incomparable 'Bridges'."

Line-up

Final members 
 Patrick Walker – vocals, guitar
 Marcus Hatfield – bass
 Andrew Prestidge – drums
 Wayne Taylor – guitar

Former members 
 John Sellings – bass (1994–1997)
 Wayne Taylor – bass (1997–1998)
 Stuart Springthorpe – drums (1994–2008)
 Christian Leitch – drums (2008–2009)

Discography 
 Revelation Looms demo, 1996
 Blessed by the Sabbath demo, 1997
 The Strength to Dream CD, 1999 (The Miskatonic Foundation)
 Watching from a Distance CD, 2006 (The Miskatonic Foundation)
 Watching from a Distance 2CD – "die-hard edition" with bonus demos CD, 2006 (The Miskatonic Foundation)
 The Right Hand of Doom – limited edition wooden box set including 'Watching from a Distance' and a second disc featuring the band's '96 and '97 demo recordings; plus sticker, postcards and badge
Watching from a Distance 2LP, 2008 (Metal Supremacy) – includes limited "die-hard edition" on coloured vinyl with poster
 The Strength to Dream 2LP, 2008 (Metal Supremacy) – includes limited "die-hard edition" coloured-vinyl with poster
Bridges 12", 2010 (Cyclone Empire)
The Demo Tapes LP, 2011 (Svart Records)
The Albums vinyl boxset, 2017 (Svart Records)
Casting Shadows (complete discography, six-tape boxset, including official bootleg of Live at Hammer of Doom festival 2017), 2019 (Darkness Shall Rise Productions)
Watching from a Distance – Live at Roadburn 2LP, 2021 (Cappio Records)

Compilation appearances
 At the Mountains of Madness CD, 1999 (The Miskatonic Foundation) – features "Cemetery Eyes"

References 

English doom metal musical groups
Musical groups established in 1994
Musical groups disestablished in 2001
Musical groups established in 2005
Musical groups disestablished in 2009
British musical trios